The enzyme [hydroxymethylglutaryl-CoA reductase (NADPH)]-phosphatase (EC 3.1.3.47) catalyzes the reaction

[hydroxymethylglutaryl-CoA reductase (NADPH)] phosphate + HO  [hydroxymethylglutaryl-CoA reductase (NADPH)] + phosphate

This enzyme belongs to the family of hydrolases, specifically those acting on phosphoric monoester bonds.  The systematic name is [hydroxymethylglutaryl-CoA reductase (NADPH)]-phosphate phosphohydrolase. This enzyme is also called reductase phosphatase.

References

 
 

EC 3.1.3
Enzymes of unknown structure